Carlos Fitz-James Stuart y Martínez de Irujo, 19th Duke of Alba, GE (né Martínez de Irujo y Fitz-James Stuart; born 2 October 1948), is a Spanish aristocrat. He is the head of the House of Alba, one of the most prominent families of the Spanish nobility.

Life and career
He was born in Madrid and is the eldest son of Cayetana Fitz-James Stuart, 18th Duchess of Alba (28 March 1926 in Madrid – 20 November 2014 in Seville) and her first husband,  (17 November 1919 in Madrid – 6 September 1972 in Houston), a younger son of the 9th Duke of Sotomayor. In 1951 (at the age of 2), he became the 14th Duke of Huéscar – a title which was ceded to him by his grandfather, Jacobo Fitz-James Stuart, 17th Duke of Alba and 13th Duke of Huéscar. He is a direct descendant of James II of England.

He obtained a degree in law at the Complutense University of Madrid and now works as an adviser for several cultural institutions, such as the Hispania Nostra Foundation, the Valencia de Don Juan Institute, and the Hispanic Society of America. He is in charge of the House of Alba Foundation and, thus, in principle of a great deal of the significant House of Alba heritage and patrimony. He is also a Knight of the Real Maestranza de Caballería de Sevilla.

Upon the death of his mother in 2014, he was first in line to succeed as 19th Duke of Alba (and Grandee of Spain) and also to inherit 38 other titles (10 of them with a Grandeeship of Spain). The succession to most of the titles was officially confirmed in 2015 except for the Lordship (Señorío) of Moguer and the County of Modica that have been inherited traditionally. Later in 2015, he ceded two titles – Duke of Huéscar to his elder son and heir apparent Fernando, and Count of Osorno to his younger son Carlos.

Family
On 13 June 1988, he married Matilde de Solís-Beaumont y Martínez de Campos in the Seville Cathedral. She is the daughter of Fernando de Solís y Atienza, 10th Marquess of la Motilla, and his wife Isabel Martínez de Campos Rodríguez, daughter of the Duke and Duchess of Seo de Urgel.

The couple had two children before their marriage was annulled in 2004:
 Fernando Fitz-James Stuart y de Solís, 17th Duke of Huéscar, Grandee of Spain (born 14 September 1990).
 Carlos Fitz-James Stuart y de Solís, 22nd Count of Osorno, Grandee of Spain (born 29 November 1991).

Subsequently, between 2004 and 2006, he maintained a friendly relationship with Alicia Koplowitz, 7th Marchioness of Bellavista, a Spanish businesswoman who ranked as Spain's richest woman in the Forbes World's Richest People list.

Titles, styles, honours and arms

Titles

Dukedoms
19th Duke of Alba, Grandee of Spain
12th Duke of Berwick, Grandee of Spain
16th Duke of Huéscar, Grandee of Spain - ceded to his son Don Fernando
12th Duke of Liria and Jérica, Grandee of Spain

Count-Dukedoms
13th Count-Duke of Olivares, Grandee of Spain

Marquessates
17th Marquess of Carpio, Grandee of Spain
17th Marquess of La Algaba
19th Marquess of Barcarrota
11th Marquess of Castañeda
24th Marquess of Coria
15th Marquess of Eliche
17th Marquess of Mirallo
21st Marquess of la Mota
21st Marquess of Moya
13th Marquess of Osera
15th Marquess of San Leonardo
20th Marquess of Sarria
13th Marquess of Tarazona
16th Marquess of Valdunquillo
19th Marquess of Villanueva del Fresno
18th Marquess of Villanueva del Río

Countships
23rd Count of Lemos, Grandee of Spain
21st Count of Lerín, Grandee of Spain, Constable of Navarre
21st Count of Miranda del Castañar, Grandee of Spain
17th Count of Monterrey, Grandee of Spain
21st Count of Osorno, Grandee of Spain - ceded to his son Don Carlos
20th Count of Andrade
15th Count of Ayala
17th Count of Casarrubios del Monte
17th Count of Fuentes de Valdepero
12th Count of Fuentidueña
18th Count of Galve
19th Count of Gelves
22nd Count of Modica (Kingdom of Sicily)
26th Count of San Esteban de Gormaz
13th Count of Santa Cruz de la Sierra
21st Count of Villalba

Viscountcies
13th Viscount of la Calzada

Lordship
30th Lord of Moguer

Styles
 1948–1951: The Most Excellent Don Carlos Martínez de Irujo y Fitz-James Stuart
 1951–2014: The Most Excellent The Duke of Huéscar
 2014–present: The Most Excellent The Duke of Alba de Tormes

Honours
  Knight Grand Cross of the Order of Isabella the Catholic
  Knight Grand Cross of Justice of the Sacred Military Constantinian Order of Saint George. Vice Grand Prefect (1970–1990).
  Knight of the Illustrious Royal Order of Saint Januarius.

Arms

References

External links
Carlos Fitz-James Stuart, Duke of Huescar. GeneAll.net
Elenco de Grandezas y Títulos Nobiliarios Españoles, Hidalguía Editions, 2008
Death Duke of Sotomayor
Auñamendi Entziklopedia
House of Híjar

|-

|-

|-

|-

1948 births
Dukes of Huéscar
Carlos Fitz-James
Living people
Nobility from Madrid
20th-century Spanish lawyers
Complutense University of Madrid alumni
Grandees of Spain
Recipients of the Order of Isabella the Catholic
Knights Grand Cross of the Order of Isabella the Catholic
Marquesses of Carpio
Spanish people of American descent
Spanish people of Basque descent
Spanish people of Belgian descent
Spanish people of English descent
Spanish people of German descent
Spanish people of Hungarian descent
Spanish people of Italian descent
Spanish people of Irish descent
Spanish people of Scottish descent
Berwick, Carlos Fitz-James Stuart, 12th Duke of
Spanish nobility